Carlos Martínez (30 September 1940 – 14 November 2015) was a Uruguayan footballer. He played in two matches for the Uruguay national football team in 1967. He was also part of Uruguay's squad for the 1967 South American Championship.

References

External links
 

1940 births
2015 deaths
Uruguayan footballers
Uruguay international footballers
Place of birth missing
Association football defenders
Club Nacional de Football players
Montevideo Wanderers F.C. players
Centro Atlético Fénix players
Defensor Sporting players
Central Español players
Rampla Juniors players